Etoushanocertidae is an extinct family of ceratitid ammonite cephalopods that were restricted to marine strata in Late Permian China.

References

Otoceratina
Permian animals
Lopingian extinctions
Ceratitida families
Lopingian first appearances